Erdemir Sport Hall is a multi-purpose indoor sport venue that is located in the Karadeniz Ereğli town of Zonguldak Province, Turkey. The hall has a seating capacity of 2,000 spectators.

The sport hall was built and is owned by Turkey's major steel producing company Erdemir. It is home to the volleyball and basketball teams of Erdemir SK, which is sponsored by Erdemir. The basketball team plays currently in the Turkish Basketball League.

References

Sport in Zonguldak
Basketball venues in Turkey
Volleyball venues in Turkey
Turkish Basketball League venues